The Samsung Galaxy J8 is an Android smartphone developed by Korean manufacturer Samsung Electronics. Announced on May 22, 2018 and released the same day along with the Galaxy J6 and the Galaxy J4, J8 is a mid-range smartphone and successor to Galaxy J7. It has a similar hardware design and software features to its high-end counterpart (Samsung Galaxy A8+) with a fingerprint sensor.

Hardware 

Samsung Galaxy J8 is a refined version of the hardware design introduced in the Samsung Galaxy J6, it has a rounded polycarbonate chassis. It has a length of 159.2 mm (6.27 in), a width of 75.7 mm (2.98 in), and a thickness of 8.2 mm (0.32 in) and it weighs 177 gram. At the top of the screen, there is a 16 MP (f/1.9) front-facing camera. At the back panel, there is a dual rear camera setup with a 16 MP (f/1.7) main camera and a 5 MP (f/1.9) depth sensor with live focus, portrait mode and background blur options. There are proximity and ambient light sensors, and a notification LED. The Galaxy J8's 6.0 inch display is larger than other phones in the same series launched in 2018. The Super AMOLED screen of the device has ~75.8% screen-to-body ratio, 720x1480 resolution, 18.5:9 aspect ratio, ~274 ppi pixel density and Corning Gorilla Glass protection. It is powered by Qualcomm Snapdragon 450 SoC with 1.8 GHz octa-core ARM Cortex-A53 processor and Adreno 506 GPU backed by 3 GB RAM/32 GB internal storage or 4 GB RAM/64 GB internal storage. It has a 3500 mAh battery.

It is worth noting that even though the Galaxy J8 ships with a 64 bit SoC (Snapdragon 450), the OEM has installed a 32 bit OS using arm_binder64 interface which downgrades the CPU capability by at least 30%.

See also 

 Samsung Galaxy
 Samsung Galaxy J series
 Samsung Galaxy J2 Core
 Samsung Galaxy J3 (2018)
 Samsung Galaxy J4 Core
 Samsung Galaxy J6
 Samsung Galaxy J4+
 Samsung Galaxy J6+

References

External links
 

Samsung mobile phones
Samsung smartphones
Android (operating system) devices
Mobile phones introduced in 2018
Mobile phones with multiple rear cameras
Discontinued smartphones